Atari Program Exchange (APX) was a division of Atari, Inc. that sold software via mail-order for the Atari 8-bit family of home computers from 1981 until 1984. Quarterly APX catalogs were sent to all registered Atari 8-bit owners. APX encouraged any programmer, not just professionals, to submit video games, educational software, applications, and utilities. If selected, a program was added to the catalog with credit given to the programmer. The top submissions of the quarter in each category were recognized. One program each year received the top honor: the Atari Star award.  Several APX titles, such as Eastern Front (1941), Caverns of Mars, and Atari Star winner Typo Attack, were moved to Atari's official product line. A few internally developed Atari products were sold through APX, such as Atari Pascal and the developer handbook De Re Atari.

The brainchild of Dale Yocum, the Atari Program Exchange started in February 1981. In 1982 its management was taken over by Fred Thorlin, who operated it until it closed. APX published quarterly catalogs until 1984, when new Atari CEO James J. Morgan closed down the mail-order division. Some APX software was later picked up by Antic Software and branded as "APX Classics".

History
When Atari first launched the Atari 8-bit family in late 1979, the company kept most of the hardware details secret. It intended to be the primary supplier of software for the platform, as had been the case with the Atari Video Computer System console. By the end of the first year on the market increasingly sophisticated applications from outside Atari were nonetheless becoming available. There were, however, a limited number of distribution channels at the time.

Dale Yocum approached Atari with the idea of setting up their own third-party publishing arm. With Atari's distribution capabilities the products would be seen by many more prospective customers, and at the same time, Atari would make money with every sale, money that would otherwise be lost. Chris Crawford later stated:

Catalogs
Atari mailed catalogs to all computer owners who sent in warranty cards. The first issue of the catalog, dated summer 1981, stated that while "Atari offers a wide variety of useful and entertaining software ... we've come across other interesting software deserving public recognition ... [APX] will make such software available quickly and inexpensively ... We'll keep costs down [by using] simple packaging and we'll rely on user-written documentation ... What we'll offer, then, is a lot of interesting software quickly and inexpensively".

The quarterly publication included descriptions and screenshots of each program, and advertisements for computer magazines. Other products sold included the book De Re Atari and various peripherals. Many APX programs were games, but it distributed a wide variety of applications, utilities, programming tools, and educational software.

Discontinuation
According to Atari CEO Morgan, APX was losing money in its mail-order business so that part was shut down:

After the discontinuation of APX, Antic magazine published some APX titles as APX Classics from Antic and continued soliciting new software as Antic Software. The Antic Software catalog, created by Gary Yost, was bound into issues of the magazine.

Products

Atari Star winners
In 1981 APX announced an award program, the Atari Star, with quarterly and yearly cash awards. All programs submitted for publishing were eligible. The annual grand prize for the best program was a trophy and $25,000. The first winner was the educational game My First Alphabet by Fernando Herrera. He used the money to cofound video game developer and publisher First Star Software which sold several of his games, including Astro Chase and Bristles.

The 1982 winner was Typo Attack by David Buehler, a game designed to improve touch typing skill. Atari published it as a cartridge in 1984.

The 1983 winner was Getaway! by Mark Reid, a maze chase game taking place across a large, scrolling city map. According to Reid, there was talk of moving the game into Atari's product line, but Atari's troubles stemming from the video game crash of 1983 kept this from happening.

Others
Eastern Front (1941), written by Chris Crawford, was the Atari Program Exchange's most popular program. The source code for Eastern Front, and a scenario editor, were sold separately. Eastern Front  and vertically-scrolling shooter Caverns of Mars were both converted to ROM cartridges and became part of the official Atari product line. One of Crawford's later games, Excalibur, was also sold through APX.

John Palevich's Dandy inspired the arcade game Gauntlet and became the home game Dark Chambers.

One of APX's top sellers was neither software nor user-written: the book De Re Atari, which contains information about the proprietary hardware of the Atari 8-bit computers. 

Atari distributed two licensed arcade ports through APX: 1978's Avalanche, credited to Dennis Koble, who wrote the original arcade game, and 1982 platformer Kangaroo, which was uncredited.

Atari Pascal was intended to be an official Atari release of the Pascal programming language, but it was instead sold through the Atari Program Exchange without support. It was designed for an unreleased, higher-spec Atari computer model, and the APX version requires two floppy drives which greatly reduced its audience.

References

External links
 APX info at Atari Archives including scans of catalogs and list of programs.

Defunct software companies of the United States
Atari 8-bit family